His Grace Gives Notice is a 1933 British comedy film directed by Leslie S. Hiscott and based on the 1922 novel His Grace Gives Notice by Lady Laura Troubridge which had previously been adapted into a 1924 film. It starred Arthur Margetson, Viola Keats, Charles Groves and Victor Stanley. It was made as a quota quickie at Twickenham Studios.

Cast
 Arthur Margetson as George Barwick
 Viola Keats as Barbara Rannock
 Victor Stanley as James Roper
 Barry Livesey as Ted Burlington
 Ben Welden as Michael Collier
 Edgar Norfolk as Captain Langley
 Dick Francis as Mr. Perks
 Laurence Hanray as Mr. Grayling
 Charles Groves as Henry Evans
 O. B. Clarence as Lord Rannock
 Gertrude Sterroll as Lady Rannock

References

External links

Bibliography
 Sutton, David R. A chorus of raspberries: British film comedy 1929-1939. University of Exeter Press, 2000.

1933 films
1933 comedy films
1930s English-language films
Films directed by Leslie S. Hiscott
Films shot at Twickenham Film Studios
British comedy films
Films set in England
Quota quickies
British black-and-white films
1930s British films